Sowards is a surname. Notable people with the surname include:

Bob Sowards (born 1968), American professional Golfer
Jack B. Sowards (1929–2007), American Screenwriter

See also
Soward